Barkcloth or bark cloth is a versatile material that was once common in Asia, Africa, and the Pacific.  Barkcloth comes primarily from trees of the family Moraceae, including Broussonetia papyrifera, Artocarpus altilis, Artocarpus tamaran, and Ficus natalensis.  It is made by beating sodden strips of the fibrous inner bark of these trees into sheets, which are then finished into a variety of items. Many texts that mention "paper" clothing are actually referring to barkcloth.

Some modern cotton-based fabrics are also named "barkcloth" for their resemblance to these traditional fabrics.

Traditional

Austronesia

Before the development of woven textiles, barkcloth made from trees belonging to the mulberry family (Moraceae) were an important aspect of the pre-Austronesian and Austronesian material culture during the Neolithic period. Stone barkcloth beaters, in particular, are considered part of the "Austronesian toolkit." They have been found in abundance in the Pearl River basin in Southern China, which is considered to be part of the homelands of the Austronesian peoples before they started migrating into islands during the Austronesian expansion (c.3000 to 1500 BC). The oldest example, found in the Dingmo Site in Guangxi, has been dated back to ~5900 BC. They were spread along with Austronesian voyagers into Island Southeast Asia, Oceania (with the notable exception of Micronesia), and Madagascar. Genetic studies on the paper mulberry populations in the Pacific have all confirmed close genealogical ties to populations in Taiwan and Southern China.

Though they exist in abundance in archaeological sites in Island Southeast Asia, barkcloth have largely disappeared in the region as they were replaced by woven textiles. But they survived until around the 19th century in the outlying regions of the Austronesian expansion, particularly in Island Melanesia and Polynesia, as well as the interior highlands of Borneo. Some communities in Southeast Asia are reviving this practice. At Monbang traditional village on Alor Island, Indonesia, tourists can see members of the Kabola ethnic group wear barkcloth and dance traditional dances.

Uganda

Barkcloth has been manufactured in Buganda, Uganda for centuries and is Uganda's sole representative on the UNESCO Intangible Cultural Heritage Lists.

Vietnam 
The production of barkcloth may have originated in Southeastern China, in a region adjacent to Vietnam. South East China was the origins to the ancestors of many people, including those who migrated to Vietnam. Throughout ancient Vietnam, the bark-cloth was widely made; this practice of producing barkcloth has survived in modern times in a few rural areas in Vietnam.

Modern cotton "barkcloth"
Today, what is commonly called barkcloth is a soft, thick, slightly textured fabric, so named because it has a rough surface like that of tree bark.  This barkcloth is usually made of densely woven cotton fibers.  Historically, the fabric has been used in home furnishings, such as curtains, drapery, upholstery, and slipcovers.  It is often associated with 1940s through 1960s home fashions, particularly in tropical, abstract, "atomic" and "boomerang" prints, the last two themes being expressed by images of atoms with electrons whirling, and by the boomerang shape which was very popular in mid-century cocktail tables and fabrics and influenced by the Las Vegas "Atomic City" era. Waverly, a famed design house for textiles and wall coverings between 1923 and 2007, called their version of this fabric rhino cloth, possibly for the rough, nubbly surface.  American barkcloth shot through with gold Lurex threads was called Las Vegas cloth, and contained as much as 65% rayon as well, making it a softer, more flowing fabric than the stiffer all-cotton rhino cloth or standard barkcloth.

See also
Cedar bark textile
Lacebark
Osnaburg
Tapa cloth

Bast shoe
Bast fibre

References

External links

 Bark Cloth − Then and Now: Amazing Discoveries, Cummings, Patricia L., Quilters' Muse Virtual Museum
Tapa: Situating Pacific Barkcloth in Time and Place Tapa: Situating Pacific Barkcloth in Time and Place A three-year AHRC funded research project at the for Textile Conservation Centre for Textile Conservation that aims to transform our understanding of Pacific barkcloth manufacture using a multidisciplinary approach

Woven fabrics
1950s fashion
1960s fashion
Indigenous textiles
Plant products